Statistics of Nemzeti Bajnokság I for the 1907–08 season.

Overview
It was contested by 9 teams, and MTK Hungária FC won the championship.

League standings

Results

References
Hungary - List of final tables (RSSSF)

1907-08
1907–08 in Hungarian football
1907–08 in European association football leagues